Jeolikote is a hill station in the Nainital district of the state of Uttarakhand, India. Jeolikote is situated at an altitude of 1,219 meters. It is also known as the Gateway to Naini Lake. It is an ideal place for those who are interested in floral culture and butterfly catching.

It acts as a pit stop for not only the tourists en route to Nainital, but also for the daily commuters who travel back and forth between Haldwani and Nainital. In the pre-independence era, it used to bea  halt point for the British to acclimatize before moving to the summer capital Nainital. This place is very fertile for vegetables and fruit. There are many old British structures in Jeolikot.

References

External links
https://uttarakhandtourism.gov.in/destination/jeolikot/

Hill stations in Uttarakhand
Nainital district